Comviva (formerly known as Mahindra Comviva) is a telecommunications company headquartered in Gurgaon, Haryana, with additional offices in Bangalore and Mumbai. It also has offices in Johannesburg, Kenya, Abidjan, Nigeria, Dubai, Sri Lanka, Bangladesh, Australia, Netherlands, the United Kingdom, Brazil, Colombia, Argentina, and the United States.

History and acquisitions
Founded in 1999 in New Delhi, Comviva was incorporated as Bharti Telesoft Limited. In April 2009, it was renamed Comviva Technologies Limited. Comviva merged with CellCloud Technologies Limited, a Bangalore headquartered company, offering "electronic top-up solutions", in December 2002. In December 2007, Comviva acquired Jataayu Software Limited, a Bangalore-based provider of "value added telecom solutions".

In September 2012, Tech Mahindra acquired a 51 percent stake in the Gurgaon-based mobile application firm Comviva from Bharti Group. In February 2013, Comviva was re-branded as Mahindra Comviva. In February 2014, it partnered with Bharti Airtel to deploy its enterprise communications platform in 16 countries across Africa. 

In January 2016, the company acquired a controlling stake in Advanced Technology Solutions (ATS), a leading provider of mobility solutions to the telecom industry in Latin America to strengthen its in-region presence. In 2019, Mahindra Comviva was re-branded again as Comviva (a Tech Mahindra company). The company was also rebranded to Comviva in 2019.

Products and Services 
Comviva’s range of mobility solutions developed and deployed spans the core areas of operators’ businesses: 

 Digital Financial Solutions – Digital Payments, Digital Banking, and Digital Lending
 Digital Systems - Digital BSS, Media and Digital Services, Integrated Messaging, Recharge and Voucher
 Growth Marketing - Customer Value Management, Digital Experience and Management, Omni-channel Marketing

References

Telecommunications companies of India